The Adventures of Marco Polo is a 1938 adventure film directed by Archie Mayo and starring Gary Cooper, Sigrid Gurie, and Basil Rathbone. It was one of the most elaborate and costly of Samuel Goldwyn's productions.

Plot
Nicolo Polo shows treasures from China and sends his son Marco Polo (Gary Cooper) there with his assistant (and comic relief) Binguccio (Ernest Truex). They sail from Venice, are shipwrecked, and cross the desert of Persia and the mountains of Tibet to China, to seek out Peking and the palace of China's ruler, Kublai Khan (George Barbier).

The philosopher/fireworks-maker Chen Tsu (H. B. Warner) is the first friend they make in the city, and invites them into his home for a meal of spaghetti. Children explode a firecracker, and Marco thinks it could be a weapon. Meanwhile, at the Palace, Ahmed (Basil Rathbone), the Emperor's adviser, harboring dubious ambitions of his own, convinces Emperor Kublai Khan that his army of a million men can conquer Japan.

Kublai Khan promises Princess Kukachin (Sigrid Gurie) to the King of Persia. Marco, arriving at the palace, sees Kukachin praying for a handsome husband. Marco is granted an audience with the emperor at the same time as a group of ladies-in-waiting arrive; Kublai Khan lets Marco test the maidens to find out which are the most worthy. Marco tests them all with a question ("How many teeth does a snapping turtle have?"), and he sends off the ones who had incorrectly guessed the answer, as well as those who had told him the correct answer (none), retaining those saying they did not know. His reasoning behind this is that they are the perfect ladies-in-waiting, not overly intelligent, and honest. Kublai agrees and Marco immediately becomes a favored guest. Ahmed shows Marco his private tower with vultures and executes a spy via a trapdoor into a lion pit. Kukachin tells Marco that she is going to marry the King of Persia, but, having fallen in love with her, he shows her what a kiss is. A guard tells Ahmed, who vows to keep Marco out of the way. Ahmed then advises Kublai Khan to send Marco into the desert to spy on suspected rebels. Kukachin warns Marco of the deceiving Ahmed.

Cast
Gary Cooper as Marco Polo
Sigrid Gurie as Princess Kukachin
Basil Rathbone as Ahmed
George Barbier as Kublai Khan
Binnie Barnes as Nazama
Ernest Truex as Binguccio
Alan Hale as Kaidu
H.B. Warner as Chen Tsu
Robert Greig as Chamberlain
Ferdinand Gottschalk as Persian Ambassador
Henry Kolker as Nicolo Polo
Lotus Liu as Visakha
Stanley Fields as Bayan
Harold Huber as Toctai
Lana Turner as Nazama's Maid
Harry Cording as Officer (uncredited) 
Jason Robards Sr. as Messenger (uncredited) 
Charles Stevens as Mongol Warrior (uncredited)

Reception
Contemporary reviews were mixed. Frank S. Nugent of The New York Times wrote that "we could never forget for a moment that it was all make-believe," referring to the actors' accents which were clearly inaccurate for the film's time and place. However, he went on, "it is amiable make-believe, rich in the outlandish pageantry Hollywood loves to manufacture, facilely narrated and enjoyably played." Variety called the film "a spectacular melodrama" and "an excellent vehicle for Cooper" and inaccurately predicted that it would be a box office hit. Film Daily called the film a "thrilling, romantic offering" and called Cooper an "excellent" choice for the role. Harrison's Reports found "Expert performances" and a romance "handled in good taste," but found that its appeal would be limited to "sophisticated audiences" because it was lacking in action. John Mosher of The New Yorker called the film "a big disappointment" and described the dialogue as having "the swing of a bad libretto." Motion Picture Daily praised the "lavish" production but said the title role would have been much better suited to Rudolph Valentino than Gary Cooper. The New York Sun wrote, "In spite of its elaborate settings and the presence of Gary Cooper, The Adventures of Marco Polo never quite lives up to its promises."

In Italy, the fascist censors considered the film disrespectful to the eponymous hero and insisted on re-dubbing it to make the protagonist a Scotsman called MacBone Pan and releasing it under the title Uno scozzese alla corte del Gran Kan (A Scotsman at the Great Khan's court).

The film was a box office flop, losing an estimated $700,000.

References

External links 

1938 films
1930s historical adventure films
American historical adventure films
American black-and-white films
Films directed by Archie Mayo
Films directed by John Ford 
Films shot in Lone Pine, California
United Artists films
Cultural depictions of Marco Polo
Cultural depictions of Kublai Khan
Samuel Goldwyn Productions films
Films set in the Yuan dynasty
Films set in the 13th century
Films scored by Hugo Friedhofer
1930s English-language films
1930s American films